Cola is both a surname and a given name. Notable people with the name include:

Given name
Cola di Rienzo (c. 1313 – 1354), Italian politician
Cola Petruccioli (1360–1401), Italian painter

Surname
Baratunde A. Cola (born 1981), American nanotechnologist
Gennaro di Cola (c. 1320 – c. 1370), Italian painter
Mattia Cola (born 1984), Italian biathlete